Sin Chaeho, or Shin Chae-ho (November 7, 1880 – February 21, 1936), was a Korean independence activist, historian, anarchist, nationalist, and a founder of Korean nationalist historiography (민족 사학, minjok sahak; sometimes shortened to minjok). He is held in high esteem in both North and South Korea. Two of his works, A New Reading of History (Doksa Sillon), written in 1908, and The Early History of Joseon (Joseon Sanggosa), published in 1931, are considered key works of nationalist historiography in modern Korea. He argued that modern Koreans and the people of Manchuria were of a single race which has an ancestral claim to both Korea and Manchuria, Shin also studied Korean mythology. During his exile in China, Shin joined the Eastern Anarchist Association and wrote anti-imperialist and pro-independence articles in various outlets; his anarchist activities lead to his arrest and subsequent death in prison, February 21, 1936.

Biography

Early years 
Shin was born on November 7, 1880. His grandfather was an official in the royal advisory department. His pen name was "Dansaeng", which he later changed to "Danjae". Shin was taught various Neo-Confucian books and concepts by his grandfather, and later enrolled in the Confucian academy Seonggyungwan, receiving a doctoral degree in 1905. Shin, to a limited capacity, read Italian literature and history and published some Italian-related works; There is some speculation that Dante might be an influence on Shin Chae-ho's work, in particular Dream Sky (1916).

Shin went on to work for the editorial boards for two newspapers, the Hwangseong Shinmun (Hangul: 황성신문; Hanja: 皇城新聞) and the Daehan Maeil Shinbo (대한매일신보; 大韓每日新報), and became the leader of the underground "patriotic enlightenment" group, the Sinminhoe. His group would later migrate to Manchuria in 1910 and attract such radicals as Yi Tong-hwi, a Korean Bolshevik who participated in "The Conspiracy case of 1911," which was an effort to assassinate Japanese Governor-General Terauchi, leading to the arrests of several Sinminhoe members and eventually the dissolution of the Sinminhoe.

Abroad 
Shin went into voluntary exile in 1910 when Japan declared its annexation of Korea; he then traveled to Vladivostok, then throughout China. Shin never returned to Korea, and since he refused to file for citizenship with the Empire of Japan he became stateless. Shin avoided politicized organizations until the March First Independence Movement, in 1919, which spurred him to join the Korean Provisional Government in Shanghai. Shin quickly became frustrated with the Provisional Government, culminating in a clash with interim leader Syngman Rhee (I Seung-man) and Shin leaving to embrace anarchism and draft the "Declaration of Korean Revolution" for the Righteous Brotherhood (Uiyeoldan) in 1923. Shin went on to join the Eastern Anarchist Association (동방 무정부주의 연맹; 東方無政府主義聯盟) in 1926.

Arrest and death 
Shin was arrested by the Japanese Military Police in Taiwan in May 1928 for the attempted smuggling of 12,000 yuan in forged banknotes out of Taiwan under the pseudonym "Yu Byeong-taek" (유병택; 柳烟澤) in an effort to help fund the Eastern Anarchist Association's general activities and bomb factory. He was sentenced to a 10-year prison term by the Dalian District Court to be served in Lüshun Prison. Shin died while in solitary confinement at Lüshun Prison of a brain hemorrhage on the 21st of February, 1936. The Republic of Korea posthumously awarded Shin with the "Presidential Order of Merit for National Foundation" in 1962 and citizenship on April 13, 2013.

Thought

The Minjok and Korean ethnic nationalism 
Shin Chae-ho wrote extensively on a theory of ethnic history which sought to challenge traditional border concepts in Korea and encourage Korean nationalism. This theory is broadly referred to as the Korean minjok (민족; 民族); An early form of the minjok is found in his article "New History Reader." Shin's minjok works contested the traditional conception of Korea as a geographically defined "peninsular nation" (반도 국; pandoguk), which was born out of politics associated with the Mandate of Heaven in classical Chinese political philosophy. This Chinese hegemony was interpreted as Sinocentric by Shin, and others, as it placed border control in the hands of the Chinese Court.

Shin's minjok historiographical work traced a nation's history by its racial genealogy and lineage, relying on heritable race and culture. The minjok was defined by the terms of its history, and history was shaped by the minjok, hence these two concepts were reciprocal and inseparable. For Shin, "if one dismisses the minjok, there is no history"; to ignore or to down-play the minjok was to devitalize history itself.

Within the greater minjok history of a nation there was a host race, the chujok (주족); the identification of the chujok was necessary for tracing the authentic history of a nation, and solidified an ethnocentric national history. For Korea, the chujok was the ancient Korean-Manchurian Kingdom of the Buyeo (부여; 夫餘), which, by Shin's estimate, began 5,000 years ago with the birth of Dangun, the legendary son of a bear who was transformed into a human by the god Whanin. By combining mythology and genealogy, a common ancestry of Koreans and Manchurians was traced, effectively making them family. Shin thereby attempted to erase the geographical border between Korea and Manchuria in favour of ethnic re-unification.

Distinct from the minjok was the state, the gukga (국가; 國家; or kukka). The minjok as a more basal concept than the gukga and did not substantially change between generations, whereas the gukga could change between kingdoms, government, and rules.

By defining the minjok as a rich and powerful ethnic history, Shin constructed an anti-imperialism and anti-colonialism social defence. Largely, the goal was rejection of both Chinese and Japanese governmental oversight and influence. Contemporaneous Japanese historians also argued that Koreans and Manchurians were the same group, but their efforts were to prove Korea was historically indistinct from other nations and thus mitigate Korea's importance.

Social Darwinism 
Shin is sometimes called a social Darwinist, a popular concept in the early 20th century. Within Shin's work, the Manchurian-Korean Buyeo minjok is interpreted as the standard of measure for historical progress in Korea. Shin described a racial history of conflict between the various races of East Asia, as well as a political history. Towards this progress, Shin's minjok project was laid out in terms of racial victories: specifically for the Buyeo, victory would be complete reunification of the race and then-on defending against cultural assimilation and imperialism.

This "Darwinian-Spencerian" framework, which prized ethnic nationalism and purity, allowed Shin to write a race-centred history of Korea that attempted to shut down the Japanese colonial justifications by conjoining ethnic history and progress, necessarily making harmful the adulteration of Korean society with Japanese culture, not a progressive one. This is somewhat analogous to Nordicism, or progressivist ethnography, but from a Korean-centric perspective.

Shin did not describe Korea as the "victor" of these racial battles. Shin described a slow fall of the minjok, primarily attributing a high point to King Muyeol of Silla, and then descent through the fall of Balhae and slow fracturing of Korean social unity through politics and war. Shin praised the Koryeo and Choseon dynasties, but insisted that the successes that they brought were only partial, lamenting that if scholars "are searching for a full unification, it cannot be found after Tangun."

Juche 
Shin Chae-ho is often credited as the primary source in the Juche (주체; 主體; meaning Self-reliance or Autonomy; sometimes spelt Chuch'e) political ideology. Juche aspires towards a country's complete autonomy, both in a national sense and in an historical sense. However, it is not clear whether the North Korean Juche is modelled upon or is merely similar to Shin's Juche. Scholars such as Sheila Miyoshi Jager have written that strong references about the history of North Korean ideology are uncommon, but similarities in language, symbolism, and the concepts make Shin Chae-ho a good candidate as an influence on Kim Il Sung and his own Juche state ideology. Shin's Juche concept is also specifically Korean; however it bears a likeness to Japanese Kokutai (국체; Kukche).

Anarchism 
Shin Chae-ho's anarchist philosophy is largely ignored by contemporary Korean scholars. One of his later works, The Dream Sky, is considered one of these anarchist-themed works, and explores themes of "clear understanding," an individual's "own way", and praises "human struggle" as a righteous path. The book also challenged literary standards by ending on an ellipsis and breaking historical continuity by borrowing characters from Korean history.

Legacy 
In South Korea, after the emancipation from Japan, Shin was not considered an important author. The term minjok was decried as politically unacceptable by Shin's old acquaintance from the Provisional Government, and now the first president of South Korea, Syngman Rhee. The new South Korean government favoured the term kukka (국가), which implied loyalty to the Republic of Korea, over Shin's minjok (민족). In the 1960s, Rhee's political regime ended and anti-imperialism sentiments redoubled, followed by scholars pursuing a new autonomous history of Korea, and revived the term minjok. By 1980, Shin Chae-ho had become a powerful figure in Korean historiography, but concepts like minjok, among others, are interpreted in ways that favour the South Korean Government over the North's.

The Park military regime in South Korea pushed for capitalist economic development, noting that dismantling the North Korean communist state would do the minjok saengjon good. Following nationalist trends, some South Korean Minjung movements made appeals to national self-reliance (minjok juchesung).

North Korea also sponsored re-reading Shin, among other Korean authors. In the Democratic People's Republic of Korea, Kim Il Sung is said to be the leader of the minjok, and follows similar genealogical tracings of Koreans into ancient Korean-Manchuria.

Shin Chae-ho is held in high esteem by North Korea and made a lasting impact on the Korean perception of Japan and imperialism generally. Two of his works, Doksa Sillon ("A New Reading of History"), written in 1908, and Joseon Sanggosa ("The Early History of Joseon"), published in 1931, are particularly important in the nationalist historiography of modern Korea.

A consequence of Shin's nationalistic thought might be the discouragement of the Korean diaspora—the closer a Korean was to Korean soil the closer they were to their cultural "space." For Shin, space, culture, and patriotism became inseparable. A worry of some Koreans is their ethno-cultural continuation, and the loss of "Korean-ness" as Koreans either travel abroad or adopt foreign customs.

Criticism

Standards of education 
Shin Chae-ho's high standards of education and early enrollment of children in school (at age 4) were criticized as excessive. He responded that some four-year-olds already knew the first one thousand characters in Chinese and that some had already begun the Children's First Learning Programme (Dongmong seonseup). He also argued that historical standards of education were steeper than the contemporary standards. All the while, Shin believed all Korean citizens should learn both Hangul and Hanja to aid in preserving Korean identity, rather than subject themselves to the Chinese language system, and to study Korean patriotic literature.

Concerns with Minjok thought 
As part of the minjok historiography, Shin rebuked some scholars for focusing too much on geography and borders rather than minjok ethnic boundaries; he called these scholars "territorial historians". However, his own works consistently employed territorial terms, boundaries, borders that only differ by how Shin justified them by a very ancient Korea, while the "territorial historians'" terms are usually traced to younger Chinese courts. This is aggravated by the fact that Shin had few, if any, compelling references for his historical claims, making his boundaries largely arbitrary or folk-history based.

Dream Sky borrowed from Dante's Divine Comedy 
Shin Chae-ho's Dream Sky at times resembles Dante's Divine Comedy. If Shin had knowingly presented a Korean-ized Divine Comedy as an authentic work of Korean fiction, it would be an adulteration of the minjok historiography project by Shin's own standards of ethno-cultural autonomy. Whether or not Shin even read Dante's Divine Comedy is purely speculative.

Bibliography 
Shin Chae-ho wrote at least 12 novels and 28 poems (17 Chinese, 3 Sijo style); he also wrote essays on literary criticism, articles published in news papers and journals, historical books, and a translation of Three Great Founders of Italy from Chinese into Korean.

Bibliographical notes

See also 

 Anarchism
 Juche
 Korea under Japanese rule
 Korean diaspora
 Korean ethnic nationalism
 Korean nationalism
 Korean independence movement

References

External links 

 www.danjae.com 
 The Online Encyclopaedia of Korean Culture 

1880 births
1936 deaths
Anti-imperialism in Korea
Anti-Japanese sentiment in Korea

Korean atheists
Korean independence activists
Historians of Korea
Korean anarchists
Korean nationalists
Left-wing nationalism
20th-century Korean philosophers
Korean novelists
Korean writers
Shin Chaeho
Kim Won-bong